There have been two baronetcies created for persons with the surname Caird, both in the Baronetage of the United Kingdom. Both creations are extinct.

The Caird Baronetcy, of Belmont Castle in the County of Perth, was created in the Baronetage of the United Kingdom on 8 February 1913 for the Scottish jute baron and mathematician James Key Caird. He was the husband of Sophie Gray. The title became extinct on his death in 1916.

The Caird Baronetcy, of Glenfarquhar in the County of Kincardine, was created in the Baronetage of the United Kingdom on 26 January 1928 for the Scottish shipowner James Caird. He was offered a peerage in 1937 but refused. The title became extinct on his death in 1954.

Caird baronets, of Belmont Castle (1913)
Sir James Key Caird, 1st Baronet (1837–1916)

Caird baronets, of Glenfarquhar (1928)
Sir James Caird, 1st Baronet (1864–1954)

References

Extinct baronetcies in the Baronetage of the United Kingdom